Cirsium setidens, also known as gondre and Korean thistle, is a perennial plant in the genus Cirsium in the family Asteraceae. It grows naturally in submontane and mountainous area in Korean peninsula where its young leaves are used as namul. In Korean, it is called goryeo-eongeongkwi (literally "Goryeo thistle") and gondeure.

Description 
Radical leaves and lower cauline ones become withered when the flowers bloom. The upper space of the leaves is hairy, while the underside is usually white-tinged without hair. Upper cauline leaves are smaller, lanceolate with pointy ends, shorter leafstalks, and spiny margin. The roots are erect.

Purple flowers bloom from July to October. Each capitulum is on the tip of a branch or the main stem. The involucels, with pointy ends and sticky underside, are arranged in seven rows.

Culinary use 
A well-known speciality of Jeongseon is gondeure-namul-bap, a type of namul made with dried gondre, seasoned with perilla oil, and served over rice.

References 

setidens
Korean vegetables
Namul